European route E 651 is a European B class road in Austria, connecting the cities Altenmarkt im Pongau – Liezen

Route 
 
 Altenmarkt im Pongau
 E57 Liezen

External links 
 UN Economic Commission for Europe: Overall Map of E-road Network (2007)
 International E-road network - E651

International E-road network
Roads in Austria